The 1998 Asian Acrobatic Gymnastics Championships were the fourth edition of the Asian Acrobatic Gymnastics Championships, and were held in Kazakhstan, in June 1998.

Medal summary

References

A
Asian Gymnastics Championships
International gymnastics competitions hosted by Kazakhstan
1998 in Kazakhstani sport